Verve Remixed is a series of albums released by Verve Records centered on the concept of classic Verve tracks, remixed by contemporary electronic music producers and DJs. The series has proven to be very popular, both with fans of the original recordings and with younger generations of music listeners, many of whom are exposed to the classic jazz and blues artists for the first time.

In addition to the albums that include the remixes, each volume of the series has a companion album titled Verve Unmixed, containing all of the music in its original form.  The three original Verve Remixed albums are also available as a boxed set, The Complete Verve Remixed Deluxe Box, along with a bonus album, Verve Remixed Plus.  A Christmas music edition of the series was released in late 2008.

Track listings

Verve Remixed (2002)

Verve Remixed 2 (2003)

Verve Remixed 2 - Extended Mixes EP (2003)

Verve Remixed 3 (2005)

Verve Remixed Plus (2005)

Verve Remixed 4 (2008)

Verve Remixed Christmas (2008)

Verve Remixed: L.A. Noire (2011)

Verve Remixed: The First Ladies (2013)

References

External links
The Official Verve Remixed Website

Record label compilation albums
2002 compilation albums
2005 compilation albums
2003 compilation albums
Jazz compilation albums
2008 compilation albums
2002 remix albums
2003 remix albums
2005 remix albums
2008 remix albums
Verve Records compilation albums
Jazz remix albums
2008 Christmas albums
Verve Records remix albums
Compilation album series